is a Japanese archer who competed at the 2012 Summer Olympics. She entered the Olympics with a world ranking of 332 but finished the preliminary ranking round for the women's individual event in sixth place. She was later eliminated in the third round of the competition by Mexico's Aída Román. In the women's team event Kanie and teammates Ren Hayakawa and Kaori Kawanaka won bronze medal after defeating Russia in the third-place match, earning Japan's first Olympic archery medal in a team event.

References

External links
 
 

Japanese female archers
1988 births
Living people
Olympic archers of Japan
Archers at the 2012 Summer Olympics
Sportspeople from Gifu Prefecture
Olympic bronze medalists for Japan
Olympic medalists in archery
Medalists at the 2012 Summer Olympics
21st-century Japanese women